"Gimme! Gimme! Gimme! (A Man After Midnight)" is a song by Swedish band ABBA. It was recorded in August 1979 in order to help promote their North American and European tour of that year, and was released on ABBA's Greatest Hits Vol. 2 album as the brand new track.

Original ABBA version

History
"Gimme! Gimme! Gimme! (A Man After Midnight)" was written and composed by Benny Andersson and Björn Ulvaeus, with the lead vocal sung by Agnetha Fältskog. Fältskog, as the narrator, weaves the image of a lonely woman who longs for a romantic relationship and views her loneliness as a forbidding darkness of night, even drawing parallels to how the happy endings of movie stars are so different from her own existence. The melody line of the song was played on an ARP Odyssey synthesizer.

Originally, ABBA had recorded another song, "Rubber Ball Man", which was planned as a single. It featured the typical "ABBA-arrangement" with both Fältskog and Anni-Frid Lyngstad on lead vocals and the use of classical strings. This song was also performed by the group during rehearsals for its 1979 tour as "Under My Sun". However, the group felt that "Gimme! Gimme! Gimme!", with its disco sound, would be a better choice, and thus, "Rubber Ball Man" remained nothing more than a demo.

Single version

The single version of this song, which was released in its full length of 4:48 everywhere else in the world, was released in the United States and Canada in an edited format, being just 3:36 in length. This was done by removing the first half of the opening instrumental, the first four of the eight bars of the instrumental bridge between the second and final chorus, and fading the song out early. It is believed the edit was done by Atlantic, ABBA's North American record label and not Polar, hence the reason why it was available only in the US and Canada. This single version has never appeared on any commercial CD issued by Polar/Universal to date and along with the US promo edit of "Chiquitita", it marked the only time Atlantic ever commercially released an edited version of an ABBA single while they had the North American rights to release ABBA recordings.

As of September 2021, it is ABBA's tenth-biggest song in the UK, including both pure sales and digital streams.

The single was never released by Polar Music in the group's native Sweden, instead being featured on the Greatest Hits Vol. 2 album, which did get a Swedish release. While Polar released the single in neighbouring Norway, Denmark, and Finland, copies of these versions were not made available in the Swedish record stores, who thus arranged to import copies of the United Kingdom version on Epic Records. Sales of these imports were sufficient for the single to reach no. 16 on the sales chart in Sweden.

Spanish version
"¡Dame! ¡Dame! ¡Dame!" is the Spanish-language version of the song. The song was released as a single to promote Gracias Por La Música in Latin America and other Spanish-speaking countries.

Reception
Cash Box called it "another exercise of sparkling euro-pop, with the slightest hint of boogie bottom to give the song an edge."

The song is notable as being one of two works in ABBA's discography (the other being Dancing Queen) that have gone on to become gay anthems.

"Gimme! Gimme! Gimme! (A Man After Midnight)" was another highly successful song for ABBA. It hit no. 1 in Belgium, Finland, France, Ireland, and Switzerland, while reaching the top 3 in Austria, West Germany, the United Kingdom, the Netherlands, and Norway. It also proved to be ABBA's most successful song in Japan, hitting no. 17.

Charts and certifications

Weekly charts

Year-end charts

Certifications and sales

A-Teens version

"Gimme! Gimme! Gimme! (A Man After Midnight)" was A-Teens' third single (fourth in other territories) from their first album The ABBA Generation, a collection of ABBA cover versions.

When the single was released in 1999 in Sweden, it earned a Gold certification. It also became their third top ten hit there and the band's third top 40 hit in Germany. The song peaked at no. 51 in Switzerland, no. 27 in the Netherlands, no. 20 in Mexico, and no. 22 in Argentina and Chile.

"Gimme! Gimme! Gimme! (A Man After Midnight)" was recorded in Spanish for the Latin American promotion that started in early 2000.

Music video
The music video was directed by Sebastian Reed, and it was filmed in Sweden.

The video starts with the boys entering a warehouse, where they find a crystal ball. Inside, there is an "alternate world" where they perform the song. Part of the video also features the band at a bowling alley where they play a few games against each other.

The video had high rotation on several music channels beginning year 2000, but it was not as successful as the first singles.

The version of the song used on the video is the Radio Version, which is shorter and includes different beats  and sounds more Techno than  the album version.

Releases
European 2-track CD single
"Gimme! Gimme! Gimme!" [Radio version] – 3:45
"A*Teens Medley" [Pierre J's Radio Mix] – 3:54

European maxi CD
"Gimme! Gimme! Gimme!" [Radio version] – 3:45
"Gimme! Gimme! Gimme!" [Extended version] – 6:02
"Gimme! Gimme! Gimme!" [Earthbound Late Show Remix] – 5:04
"A*Teens Medley" [Pierre J's Full Length Mix] – 8:19

Mexican CD single
"Gimme! Gimme! Gimme!" [Radio version] – 3:45
"¡Dame! ¡Dame! ¡Dame!" [Versión en español] – 3:43 (Spanish translations by Buddy McCluskey and Mary McCluskey)

Japanese maxi CD
"Gimme! Gimme! Gimme!" [Radio version] – 3:45
"A*Teens Medley" [Pierre J's Radio Mix] – 3:54
"Mamma Mia" [Versión en español] – 3:46 (Spanish translations by Buddy McCluskey and Mary McCluskey)
"¡Dame! ¡Dame! ¡Dame!" [Versión en español] – 3:43 (Spanish translations by Buddy McCluskey and Mary McCluskey)

1 Track CD'''
"Gimme! Gimme! Gimme!" [Radio version] – 3:45

Charts

Star Academy France version

In 2001, the song was covered by the first edition of the French TV reality show Star Academy 1. The song was credited to Olivia Ruiz, Jenifer Bartoli and Carine Haddadou, three of the contestants. This version went straight to no. 1 in France, dislodging Star Academy's previous hit, "La Musique (Angelica)", and stayed atop for two weeks.

Track listings
 CD single
"Gimme ! Gimme ! Gimme ! (A Man After Midnight)" – 3:30
"Brigitte Bardot" (remix edit) by Jean-Pascal Lacoste – 3:01

Charts

Cher version

American singer and actress Cher covered the song on her album Dancing Queen, released on 28 September 2018. Cher's version is the lead single on the album. The accompanying audio video for "Gimme! Gimme! Gimme! (A Man After Midnight)" was premiered through Cher's official YouTube channel on 9 August 2018. An extended version of the track was later released on 14 September 2018. The song peaked at number 4 on the Hot Dance Club Songs chart.

Critical reception
Writing for Rolling Stone, Brittany Spanos felt that "working with producer Mark Taylor who helped seal Cher's legacy with the game-changing 'Believe' in the late Nineties, she finds subtle changes that update ABBA classics without totally stripping them of the catchiness that made those songs beloved hits well beyond their heyday. 'Gimme! Gimme! Gimme! (A Man After Midnight)', 'SOS' and 'Mamma Mia' are given just enough of a knob turn that they're transformed from upbeat FM radio pop into club bangers, pulsating with every beat."

Track listing
Digital download
"Gimme! Gimme! Gimme! (A Man After Midnight)" – 4:11

Gimme! Gimme! Gimme! (A Man After Midnight) [Extended Mix] – Single
"Gimme! Gimme! Gimme! (A Man After Midnight) [Extended Mix]" – 7:25

Gimme! Gimme! Gimme! (A Man After Midnight) [Midnight Mixes]
"Gimme! Gimme! Gimme! (A Man After Midnight) [Extended Mix]" – 7:25
"Gimme! Gimme! Gimme! (A Man After Midnight) [Offer Nissim Needs a Man Remix]" – 7:19
"Gimme! Gimme! Gimme! (A Man After Midnight) [Love To Infinity Classic Remix]" – 5:27
"Gimme! Gimme! Gimme! (A Man After Midnight) [Guy Scheiman Anthem Remix]" – 7:19
"Gimme! Gimme! Gimme! (A Man After Midnight) [Ralphi Rosario Remix]" – 7:52
"Gimme! Gimme! Gimme! (A Man After Midnight) [Love To Infinity Insomniac Remix]" – 6:11
"Gimme! Gimme! Gimme! (A Man After Midnight) [Danny Verde Remix]" – 5:54
"Gimme! Gimme! Gimme! (A Man After Midnight) [Chris Cox Anthem Remix]" – 6:06
"Gimme! Gimme! Gimme! (A Man After Midnight) [Guy Scheiman Anthem Dub Remix]" – 6:06
"Gimme! Gimme! Gimme! (A Man After Midnight) [Ralphi Rosario Dub Remix]" – 6:27

Credits and personnel
Credits for Dancing Queen adapted from AllMusic.

Management
Published by Universal Songs of PolyGramInt., Inc. (ASCAP) and EMI Waterford Music Inc. (ASCAP)
Recorded by Mark Taylor and Paul Meehan at Metrophonic Studios, London
Mixed by Matt Furmidge and Mark Taylor at Metrophonic Studios, London
Mastered by Stephen Marcussen Mastering, Hollywood, CA

Personnel
Cher – primary vocals
Benny Andersson – songwriter
Björn Ulvaeus – songwriter
Ash Soan – drums
Adam Phillips – guitars
Hayley Sanderson – backing vocals
Andy Caine – backing vocals

Charts

Film version

"Gimme! Gimme! Gimme! (A Man After Midnight)" was the first single released from the soundtrack for the 2008 film version of Mamma Mia! by American actress Amanda Seyfried, who plays Sophie in the film. In the film, only the chorus is sung while the rest of the song is instrumental, much like the original stage play. On the soundtrack, Seyfried sings the complete song as a solo performance, and also does the same in a music video to promote the movie. The version on the soundtrack is a minute shorter than the version featured on the film's tie-in website.

Charts

Certifications

Other covers and uses

 Erasure version 
In 1986, Erasure released a live version of the song as a B-side to their single Oh L'amour and then in 1987 on their US version of the album The Two Ring Circus.

 Abbacadabra version 
Tribute group Abbacadabra released a cover of the song on their album "Abbasalute" through Almighty Records in 1992. Mixes of the group's cover version were most recently included on its 2008 compilation We Love ABBA: The Mamma Mia Dance Compilation. Audio samples can be heard on the official Almighty Records website.

 BBC sitcom 
The British sitcom comedy Gimme Gimme Gimme recorded a short version of the song as its title theme in 1999.

 Mamma Mia! version 
"Gimme! Gimme! Gimme! (A Man After Midnight)" is one of the major numbers in the Mamma Mia! musical and movie. The movie version was released as a single in 2008. 

 BNB version 
In 2008, the song was covered in a jazz/lounge style by American group BNB on its album Bossa Mia: Songs of ABBA. 

 Unix/Linux Easter egg 
The Unix/Linux computer operating system command line utility "man" for displaying manual pages would print "gimme gimme gimme" when run without arguments on 00:30 (as the opening lyrics of the song are "half past twelve"). The Easter egg has been removed since version man-db 2.8.0 after it had been discovered as an annoyance in a software automatic test system on 20 November 2017 and brought to broad attention on the Stack Exchange Q&A network site dedicated to Unix & Linux.

Sampling
In 2005, the song was sampled by Madonna, who used it on her worldwide hit single "Hung Up" from Confessions on a Dance Floor''. Madonna is said to have sent a letter to Benny Andersson and Björn Ulvaeus asking to use the song as a sample, since the Swedish songwriting duo are reluctant to let other artists sample their material. It was only the second time that an ABBA track had been officially sampled, the first being the Fugees in 1996 with their hit "Rumble in the Jungle", sampling part of 1977's "The Name of the Game".

Ava Max "subtly sample[d]" the ABBA song in her 2019 single "Torn". Max stated that she listened to ABBA and Ace of Base during her childhood, and wanted to "add a little disco flair in there".

Rina Sawayama sampled the guitar riff of the ABBA song in her 2022 single "This Hell.

See also
List of European number-one hits of 1979
List of number-one singles of 1979 (Ireland)
List of number-one singles from 1968 to 1979 (Switzerland)
List of number-one singles of 2002 (France)

References

1979 songs
1979 singles
2000 singles
2002 singles
2018 singles
ABBA songs
A-Teens songs
Cher songs
Decca Records singles
European Hot 100 Singles number-one singles
Irish Singles Chart number-one singles
Island Records singles
Music videos directed by Lasse Hallström
Number-one singles in Finland
Number-one singles in France
Number-one singles in Switzerland
Oricon International Singles Chart number-one singles
Polar Music singles
Polydor Records singles
Songs about loneliness
Songs about nights
Songs written by Benny Andersson and Björn Ulvaeus
Star Academy France songs
Ultratop 50 Singles (Flanders) number-one singles
Universal Music Group singles
Warner Records singles